Grammar Carlton Rugby Football Club was a rugby union club based in Auckland, New Zealand. The club was established in 1996 as a merger between the Grammar Old Boys and Carlton clubs. The club was affiliated with the Auckland Rugby Football Union. In 2013, Grammar Carlton merged with Teachers Eastern to form Grammar TEC.

History
Grammar Carlton was formed in 1996, as a merger between Grammar Old Boys (established in 1914) and Carlton (established in 1982, as a merger between Cornwall and Grafton, who were themselves established in 1922 and 1874, respectively). The club are based at Cornwall Park, which was the home of Carlton prior to the 1996, and Cornwall prior to 1982. The premier team won its first and only Gallaher Shield in 2012, defeating Marist in the final by 30 - 9.

External links
Grammar TEC club website

Sport in Auckland
New Zealand rugby union teams